This is a list of the National Register of Historic Places listings in Kleberg County, Texas.

This is intended to be a complete list of properties and districts listed on the National Register of Historic Places in Kleberg County, Texas. There are one National Historic Landmark district and five individual properties listed on the National Register in the county. One individually listed property is a State Antiquities Landmark while two others are Recorded Texas Historic Landmarks. The district includes additional Recorded Texas Historic Landmarks.

Current listings

The locations of National Register properties and districts may be seen in a mapping service provided.

|}

See also

National Register of Historic Places listings in Texas
List of National Historic Landmarks in Texas
Recorded Texas Historic Landmarks in Kleberg County

References

External links

Kleberg County, Texas
Kleberg County
Buildings and structures in Kleberg County, Texas